

R

Ra – Re 

 

Raadeite (allactite: IMA1996-034) 8.BE.30   [no] (IUPAC: heptamagnesium octahydro diphosphate)
Rabbittite (Y: 1955) 5.ED.25    (IUPAC: tricalcium trimagnesium diuranyl tetrahydro hexacarbonate octadecahydrate)
Rabejacite (zippeite: IMA1992-043) 7.EC.10    (IUPAC: dicalcium [tetrauranyl tetraoxo disulfate] octawater)
Raberite (IMA2012-017) 2.0  [no] [no] (Tl5Ag4As6SbS15)
Radekškodaite
Radekškodaite-(Ce) (IMA2019-042) 9.B?.  [no] [no]
Radekškodaite-(La) (IMA2018-107) 9.B?.  [no] [no]
Radhakrishnaite (IMA1983-082) 3.AA.50    (IUPAC: lead tritelluride di(chloride,sulfide))
Radovanite (IMA2000-001) 8.CB.40   [no] (IUPAC: dicopper iron(III) arsenate [arsenic(V) tetraoxy][arsenic(III) dioxyhydro] monohydrate)
Radtkeite (IMA1989-030) 2.FC.15d    (IUPAC: trimercury disulfide chloride iodide)
Radvaniceite (IMA2021-052) 2.EA.  [no] [no] (IUPAC: germanium disulfide)
Raguinite (IMA1968-022) 2.CB.60    (IUPAC: thallium iron disulfide)
Raisaite (tellurium oxysalt: IMA2014-046) 4.0  [no] [no] (IUPAC: copper magnesium dihydrotetraoxotellurate(VI) hexahydrate)
Raite (IMA1972-010) 9.EE.55   
Rajite (tellurite: IMA1978-039) 4.JK.20    (IUPAC: copper pentaoxoditellurate(IV))
Rakovanite (decavanadate: IMA2010-052) 8.0  [no]  (IUPAC: trisodium {trihydrogen octaicosaoxodecavanadate} pentadecahydrate)
Ralphcannonite (routhierite: IMA2014-077) 2.0  [no] [no] (IUPAC: silver dizinc thallium hexasulfide diarsenide)
Ramaccioniite (IMA2018-082) 7.0  [no] [no] (IUPAC: tetracopper hexahydro selenate)
Ramanite 6.EA.10
Ramanite-(Cs) (IMA2007-007) 6.EA.10   [no]
Ramanite-(Rb) (IMA2007-006) 6.EA.10   [no]
Ramazzoite (IMA2017-090) 7.0  [no] [no]
Rambergite (würzite: IMA1995-028) 2.CB.45    (IUPAC: manganese sulfide)
Ramdohrite (lillianite: 1930) 2.JB.40a   
Rameauite (compreignacite: IMA1971-045) 4.GB.05    (IUPAC: dipotassium calcium hexauranyl tetrahydro hexaoxide hexahydrate)
Ramikite-(Y) (IMA2009-021) 8.0  [no] 
Rammelsbergite (löllingite: 1845) 2.EB.15a    (IUPAC: nickel diarsenide)
Ramosite (IMA2019-099) 2.0  [no] [no]
Ramsbeckite (IMA1984-067) 7.DD.60    (IUPAC: pentadecacopper docosahydro tetrasulfate hexahydrate)
Ramsdellite (ramsdellite: 1932) 4.DB.15a    (IUPAC: manganese(IV) dioxide)
Ranciéite (Y: 1857) 4.FL.40   
Rankachite (IMA1983-044) 7.GB.25   
Rankamaite (IMA1968-002) 4.DM.05   
Rankinite (Y: 1942) 9.BC.15    (IUPAC: tricalcium heptaoxodisilicate)
Ransomite (Y: 1928) 7.CB.80    (IUPAC: copper diiron(III) tetrasulfate hexahydrate)
Ranunculite (IMA1978-067) 8.EB.40    (IUPAC: aluminium uranyl trihydro hydroxophosphate tetrahydrate)
Rapidcreekite (IMA1984-035) 7.DG.20    (IUPAC: dicalcium sulfate carbonate tetrahydrate)
Rappoldite (tsumcorite: IMA1998-015) 8.CG.20   [no] (IUPAC: lead dicobalt diarsenate dihydrate)
Raslakite (eudialyte: IMA2002-067) 9.CO.10   [no]
Raspite (Y: 1897) 4.DG.20    (IUPAC: lead tungsten tetraoxide)
Rastsvetaevite (eudialyte: IMA2000-028) 9.CO.10   [no]
Rasvumite (cubanite: IMA1970-028) 2.FB.20    (IUPAC: potassium diiron trisulfide)
Rathite: sartorite group
(Rathite-I) (sartorite: 1896) 2.HC.05d   
(Rathite-IV)Q (sartorite: 1964) 2.0  [no] [no] Note: monoclinic phase with 140Å periodicity.
Rauchite (autunite: IMA2010-037) 8.EB.05  [no]  (IUPAC: nickel diuranyl diarsenate decahydrate)
Rauenthalite (IMA1964-007) 8.CJ.40    (IUPAC: tricalcium diarsenate decahydrate)
RauviteQ (decavanadate: 1922) 4.HB.40    (IUPAC: calcium diuranyl decavanadate hexadecahydrate)
Ravatite (IMA1992-019) 10.BA.40    (IUPAC: phenanthrene)
Raygrantite (iranite: IMA2013-001) 7.0  [no] [no] (IUPAC: decalead zinc hexasulfate ditetraoxosilicate dihydroxyl)
Rayite (IMA1982-029) 2.HC.10d   
Realgar (Y: 1747) 2.FA.15a    (IUPAC: arsenic sulfide)
Reaphookhillite (IMA2018-128) 8.0  [no] [no] (IUPAC: magnesio dizinc diphosphate tetrahydrate)
Rebulite (IMA2008 s.p., 1982 Rd) 2.HD.25    (Tl5Sb5As8S22)
Rectorite (corrensite: IMA1967 s.p., 1891) 9.EC.60   
Rectorite-K: a 1:1 regular interstratification of muscovite/illite (dioctahedral mica) and montmorillonite (dioctahedral smectite).
Rectorite-Na: a 1:1 regular interstratification of paragonite and montmorillonite.
Redcanyonite (zippeite: IMA2016-082) 7.0  [no] [no] (IUPAC: diammonium manganese [tetrauranyl tetraoxo disulfate] tetra(water))
Reddingite (reddingite: IMA1980 s.p., 1878 Rd) 8.CC.05    (IUPAC: trimanganese(II) diphosphate trihydrate)
Redgillite (IMA2004-016) 7.DD.70    (IUPAC: hexacopper decahydro sulfate monohydrate)
RedingtoniteQ (halotrichite: 1888) 7.CB.85    (IUPAC: iron(II) dichromium tetrasulfate docosahydrate)
Redledgeite (hollandite, coronadite: IMA1967 s.p., 1928) 4.DK.05b    (IUPAC: barium (hexatitanium dichromium(III)) hexadecaoxide)
Redmondite (IMA2021-072) 7.JA.  [no] [no]
RedonditeQ (Y: 1869, 1967 s.p.) 8.CD.10  [no] [no] Note: possibly a variety of variscite.
Reederite-(Y) (IMA1994-012) 5.BF.20    (IUPAC: pentadeca(sodium,manganese) diyttrium chloro nonacarbonate (fluorsulfate))
Reedmergnerite (feldspar: IMA1962 s.p., 1955) 9.FA.35    (IUPAC: sodium boroctaoxotrisilicate)
Reevesite (hydrotalcite: MA1966-025) 5.DA.50    (IUPAC: hexanickel diiron(III) hexadecahydro carbonate tetrahydrate)
Refikite (Y: 1852) 10.CA.05   
Reichenbachite (IMA1985-044) 8.BD.05    (IUPAC: pentacopper tetrahydro diphosphate)
Reidite (IMA2001-013) 9.AD.45   [no] (IUPAC: zirconium tetraoxosilicate)
Reinerite (Y: 1958) 4.JA.10    (IUPAC: trizinc diarsenite)
Reinhardbraunsite (humite: IMA1980-032) 9.AF.45    (IUPAC: pentacalcium ditetraoxosilicate dihydroxyl)
Relianceite-(K) (IMA2020-102) 8.DG.  [no] [no]
Rémondite (burbankite) 5.AD.15
Rémondite-(Ce) (IMA1987-035) 5.AD.15   
Rémondite-(La) (IMA1999-006) 5.AD.15   
RenarditeQ (Y: 1928) 8.0  [no] [no] (IUPAC: lead tetrauranyl tetrahydro diphosphate heptahydrate)
Rengeite (chevkinite: IMA1998-055) 9.BE.70   [no] (IUPAC: tetrastrontium tetratitanium zirconium octaoxo diheptaoxodisilicate)
Renierite (germanite: IMA2007 s.p., 1948) 2.CB.35a    ((Cu1+,Zn)11Fe4(Ge4+,As5+)2S16)
Reppiaite (IMA1991-007) 8.BD.20    (IUPAC: pentamanganese(II) tetrahydro divanadate)
Retgersite (Y: 1949) 7.CB.30    (IUPAC: nickel sulfate hexahydrate)
Retzian 8.BM.05 (IUPAC: dimanganese(II) REE tetrahydro arsenate)
Retzian-(Ce) (IMA1982 s.p., 1894 Rd) 8.BM.05    
Retzian-(La) (IMA1983-077) 8.BM.05    
Retzian-(Nd) (IMA1982 s.p.) 8.BM.05   
Revdite (IMA1979-082) 9.DM.30   
Reyerite (gyrolite: 1906) 9.EE.35   
Reynoldsite (IMA2011-051) 7.0  [no] [no] (IUPAC: dilead dimanganese(IV) pentaoxochromate)
Reznitskyite (IMA2021-067)  [no] [no]

Rh – Ry 
Rhabdoborite
Rhabdoborite-(Mo) (IMA2019-114) 6.0  [no] [no]
Rhabdoborite-(V) (IMA2017-108) 6.0  [no] [no]
Rhabdoborite-(W) (IMA2017-109) 6.0  [no] [no]
Rhabdophane 8.CJ.45 (IUPAC: REE phosphate monohydrate)
Rhabdophane-(Ce) (IMA1987 s.p., 1885) 8.CJ.45   
Rhabdophane-(La) (IMA1987 s.p., 1883) 8.CJ.45   
Rhabdophane-(Nd) (IMA1966 s.p., 1951) 8.CJ.45   
Rhabdophane-(Y) (IMA2011-031) 8.CJ.45  [no] 
Rheniite (IMA1999-004a) 2.EB.35   [no] (IUPAC: rhenium disulfide)
RheniumD (element: 1976) 1.AB.05  [no] 
Rhodarsenide (IMA1996-030) 2.AC.25b   [no] (IUPAC: dirhodium arsenide)
Rhodesite (rhodesite: 1957) 9.EB.05   
Rhodium (element: IMA1974-012) 1.AF.10   
Rhodizite (Y: 1834) 6.GC.05    (IUPAC: potassium tetraberyllium tetralumino (beryllium undecaborate) octaicosaoxide)
Rhodochrosite (calcite: IMA1962 s.p., 1813) 5.AB.05    (IUPAC: manganese carbonate)
Rhodonite (rhodonite: IMA1980 s.p., 1819) 9.DK.05    (IUPAC: manganese(II) trioxosilicate)
Rhodostannite (spinel, linnaeite: IMA1968-018) 2.DA.10    (IUPAC: di(copper,silver) iron octasulfide tristannide)
Rhodplumsite (IMA1982-043) 2.BE.15    (IUPAC: trirhodium dilead disulfide)
Rhomboclase (Y: 1891) 7.CB.55   
Rhönite (sapphirine: IMA2007 s.p., 1907) 9.DH.40   
Ribbeite (humite: IMA1985-045) 9.AF.65    (IUPAC: pentamanganese(II) di(tetraoxosilicate) dihydroxyl)
Richardsite (stannite: IMA2019-136) 2.0  [no] [no]
Richardsollyite (IMA2016-043) 2.0  [no] [no] (IUPAC: thallium lead sulfarsenite)
RichelliteQ (Y: 1883) 8.BB.90    (IUPAC: calcium diron(III) diphosphate di(hydroxy,fluorine))
Richelsdorfite (IMA1982-019) 8.DK.    (IUPAC: dicalcium pentacopper antimony(V) hexahydro chloro tetrarsenate hexahydrate)
Richetite (Y: 1947) 4.GB.15   
Richterite [Na-Ca-amphibole: IMA2012 s.p., IMA1997 s.p., 1865] 9.DE.20   
Rickardite (Y: 1903) 2.BA.30   
Rickturnerite (IMA2010-034) 3.DB.  [no]  (IUPAC: heptalead tetraoxo [tetrahydroxy magnesium] hydroxytrichloride)
Riebeckite [Na-amphibole: IMA2012 s.p., IMA1997 s.p., 1888] 9.DE.25   
Riesite (IMA2015-110a) 4.0  [no] [no] (IUPAC: titanium dioxide)
Rietveldite (IMA2016-081) 7.0  [no] [no] (IUPAC: iron uranyl disulfate pentawater)
RilanditeQ (Y: 1933) 9.HB.10   
Rimkorolgite (IMA1990-032) 8.CH.45    (IUPAC: barium pentamagnesium tetraphosphate octahydrate)
Ringwoodite (spinel, ringwoodite: IMA1968-036) 9.AC.15    (IUPAC: dimagnesium tetraoxosilicate)
Rinkite (seidozerite, rinkite) 9.00.20
Rinkite-(Ce) (IMA2016 s.p., IMA2009-C, 1884) 9.00.20   
Rinkite-(Y) (IMA2017-043) 9.00.20  [no] [no]
Rinmanite (nolanite: IMA2000-036) 4.CB.40    (IUPAC: dimagnesium tetrairon dizinc diantimony dihydro tetradecaoxide)
Rinneite (rinneite: 1909) 3.CJ.05    (IUPAC: tripotassium sodium iron(II) hexachloride)
Riomarinaite (IMA2000-004) 7.DF.75    (IUPAC: bismuth hydro sulfate monohydrate)
Ríosecoite (IMA2018-023) 8.0  [no] [no]
Riotintoite (IMA2015-085) 7.0  [no] [no] (IUPAC: aluminium hydro sulfate trihydrate)
Rippite (IMA2016-025) 9.0  [no] [no]
Rittmannite (whiteite: IMA1987-048) 8.DH.15   
Rivadavite (IMA1966-010) 6.FA.20    (IUPAC: hexasodium magnesium tetra[hexahydro heptaoxohexaborate] decahydrate)
RiversideiteQ (tobermorite: 1917) 9.DG.10    (IUPAC: pentacalcium hexadecaoxohexasilicate dihydroxyl dihydrate)
Roaldite (nitride: IMA1980-079) 1.BC.05    (IUPAC: tetra(iron,nickel) nitride)
Robertsite (arseniosiderite: IMA1973-024) 8.DH.30    (IUPAC: dicalcium trimanganese(III) dioxotriphosphate trihydrate)
Robinsonite (Y: 1952) 2.HC.20    (Pb4Sb6S13)
Rockbridgeite (rockbridgeite: 1949) 8.BC.10    (IUPAC: iron(II) tetrairon(III) pentahydro triphosphate)
Rodalquilarite (tellurite: IMA1967-040) 4.JL.05    (IUPAC: trihydrogen diron(III) chloro tetratellurate(IV))
Rodolicoite (quartz: IMA1995-038) 8.AA.05    (IUPAC: iron(III) phosphate)
Roeblingite (Y: 1897) 9.CB.05   
Roedderite (milarite: IMA1965-023) 9.CM.05   
Rogermitchellite (IMA2003-019) 9.C  [no] 
Roggianite (zeolitic tectosilicate: IMA1968-015) 9.GB.20   
Rohaite (IMA1973-043) 2.BD.35   
Rokühnite (IMA1979-036) 3.BB.10    (IUPAC: iron dichloride dihydrate)
Rollandite (IMA1998-001) 8.CD.30    (IUPAC: tricopper diarsenate tetrahydrate)
Romanèchite (IMA1982 s.p., 1900) 4.DK.10   
Romanorlovite (IMA2014-011) 3.0  [no] [no] (IUPAC: undecapotassium nonacopper tetrahydro pentaicosachloride dihydrate)
Romarchite (IMA1969-006) 4.AC.20    (IUPAC: tin oxide), anthropogenic
(Roméite group (A2Sb2O6Y), pyrochlore supergroup )
Römerite (Y: 1858) 7.CB.75    (IUPAC: iron(II) diron(III) tetrasulfate tetradecahydrate)
Rondorfite (IMA1997-013) 9.AB.20   [no] (IUPAC: octacalcium magnesium tetra(tetraoxosilicate) dichloride)
Rongibbsite (zeolitic aluminosilicate: IMA2010-055) 9.G  [no] [no] (IUPAC: dilead (aluminotetrasilicate) undecaoxyhydroxyl)
Ronneburgite (IMA1998-069) 8.AC.75   [no] (IUPAC: dipotassium manganese dodecaoxotetravanadate)
Röntgenite-(Ce) (IMA1987 s.p., 1953) 5.BD.20d    (IUPAC: dicalcium tricerium trifluoro pentacarbonate)
Rooseveltite (monazite: 1947) 8.AD.50    (IUPAC: bismuth arsenate)
Roquesite (chalcopyrite: IMA1962-001) 2.CB.10a    (IUPAC: copper indium disulfide)
Rorisite (matlockite: IMA1989-015) 3.DC.25    (IUPAC: calcium chloride fluoride)
Rosasite (malachite: 1908) 5.BA.10    (IUPAC: copper zinc dihydro carbonate)
Roscherite (roscherite: 1914) 8.DA.10    (IUPAC: dicalcium pentamanganese(V) tetraberyllium tetrahydro pentaphosphate hexahydrate)
Roscoelite (mica: IMA1998 s.p., 1876) 9.EC.15    (IUPAC: potassium divanadium(III) (aluminotrisilicate) decaoxydihydroxyl)
Roselite (roselite: 1824) 8.CG.10    (IUPAC: dicalcium cobalt diarsenate dihydrate)
Rosemaryite (alluaudite, wyllieite: IMA1979 s.p.) 8.AC.15    (IUPAC: vacancy sodium manganese(II) (iron(III) aluminium) triphosphate)
Rosenbergite (IMA1992-046) 3.CD.05    (IUPAC: dialumino difluoride octa[fluoride water] dihydrate)
Rosenbuschite (seidozerite, rinkite: 1887) 9.BE.22    
Rosenhahnite (IMA1965-030) 9.BJ.10    (IUPAC: tricalcium octaoxotrisilicate dihydroxyl)
Roshchinite (lillianite: IMA1989-006) 2.JB.40a   
Rosiaite (IMA1995-021) 4.DH.25    (IUPAC: lead ditin hexaoxide)
Rosickýite (Y: 1931) 1.CC.05    (IUPAC: sulfur)
RosièresiteQ,H (Y: 1841) 8.DF.10  [no]  Note: an amorphous hydrous phosphate of Al with Pb and Cu.
Rossiantonite (IMA2012-056) 7.0  [no] [no] (IUPAC: trialuminium dihydro phosphate disulfate decawater tetrahydrate)
Rossite (Y: 1927) 4.HD.05    (IUPAC: calcium di(trixovanadate) tetrahydrate)
Rösslerite (Y: 1861) 8.CE.20    (IUPAC: magnesium hydroxoarsenate heptahydrate)
Rossmanite (tourmaline: IMA1996-018) 9.CK.05   [no]
Rossovskyite (columbite: IMA2014-056) 4.0  [no] [no]
Rostite (IMA1988 s.p., 1979 Rd) 7.DB.10    (IUPAC: aluminium hydro sulfate pentahydrate)
Roterbärite (IMA2019-043) 2.0  [no] [no]
Rouaite (nitrate: IMA1999-010) 5.NB.05    (IUPAC: dicopper trihydro nitrate)
Roubaultite (IMA1970-030) 5.EA.25    (IUPAC: dicopper dioxo triuranyl dihydro dicarbonate tetrahydrate)
Roumaite (mosandrite: IMA2008-024) 9.B  [no] 
Rouseite (IMA1984-071) 4.JC.15    (IUPAC: dilead manganese(II) diarsenate dihydrate)
Routhierite (routhierite: IMA1973-030) 2.GA.40    (IUPAC: copper thallium dimercury hexasulfide diarsenide)
Rouvilleite (IMA1989-050) 5.BC.10    (IUPAC: trisodium calcium manganese(II) fluoro tricarbonate)
Rouxelite (IMA2002-062) 2.JB.25j    (Cu2HgPb22Sb28S64(O,S)2)
Roweite (Y: 1937) 6.DA.25    (IUPAC: dicalcium dimanganese(II) hexahydro heptaoxotetraborate)
Rowlandite-(Y) (IMA1987 s.p., 1891) 9.HG.20    (IUPAC: iron(II) tetrayttrium di(heptaoxodisilicate) difluoride)
Rowleyite (IMA2016-037) 4.0  [no] [no]
Roxbyite (IMA1986-010) 2.BA.05    (IUPAC: nonacopper pentasulfide)
Roymillerite (molybdophyllite: IMA2016-061) 09.H  [no] [no]
Rozenite (starkeyite: IMA1963 s.p., IMA1962-006 Rd) 7.CB.15    (IUPAC: iron(II) sulfate tetrahydrate)
Rozhdestvenskayaite-(Zn) (tetrahedrite: IMA2018-K, IMA2016-094) 2.0  [no] [no] (Ag10Zn2Sb4S13)
Rruffite (roselite: IMA2009-077) 8.CG.10  [no] [no] (IUPAC: dicalcium copper diarsenate dihydrate)
Ruarsite (arsenopyrite: IMA1980 s.p., 1979) 2.EB.20    (IUPAC: ruthenium sulfarsenide)
Rubicline (feldspar: IMA1996-058) 9.FA.30   [no] (IUPAC: rubidium (aluminoctaoxotrisilicate))
Rubinite (garnet: IMA2016-110) 9.A  [no] [no] (IUPAC: tricalcium dititanium(III) dodecaoxotrisilicate)
Rucklidgeite (aleksite: IMA1975-029) 2.GC.40c    (IUPAC: lead dibismuth tetratelluride)
Rudabányaite (IMA2016-088) 8.0  [no] [no] (IUPAC: (disilver dimercury) chloro arsenate)
Rudashevskyite (sphalerite: IMA2005-017) 2.CB.05a   [no] (IUPAC: (iron,zinc) sulfide)
Rudenkoite (IMA2003-060) 9.HA.50   
Rüdlingerite (IMA2016-054a) 4.0  [no] [no] (IUPAC: dimanganese(II) heptaoxovanadate(V)arsenate(V) dihydrate)
Rudolfhermannite (zemannite: IMA2021-099) 4.JM.  [no] [no]
Ruifrancoite (roscherite: IMA2005-061a) 8.DA.10   [no]
Ruitenbergite (IMA1992-011) 6.GD.05   
Ruizite (ruizite: IMA1977-007) 9.BJ.35   
Rumoiite (tin alloy: IMA2018-161) 1.0  [no] [no] (IUPAC: gold ditin alloy)
Rumseyite (IMA2011-091) 3.0  [no] [no] (IUPAC: [dilead oxofluoride] chloride)
Rusakovite (IMA1962 s.p., 1960) 8.DF.15    (IUPAC: penta(iron,aluminium) nonahydro divanadate trihydrate)
Rusinovite (IMA2010-072) 9.B  [no] [no] (IUPAC: decacalcium tri(heptaoxodisilicate) dichlorine)
Russellite (Y: 1938) 4.DE.15    (IUPAC: dibismuth hexaoxotungstate)
Russoite (IMA2015-105) 4.0  [no] [no] (IUPAC: diammonium dichlorine hexaoxotetraarsenate water)
Rustenburgite (auricupride: IMA1974-040) 1.AG.10    (IUPAC: triplatinum tin alloy)
Rustumite (IMA1964-004) 9.BG.30    (IUPAC: decacalcium di(heptaoxodisilicate) tetrasilicate dihydroxyl dichlorine)
Ruthenarsenite (modderite: IMA1973-020) 2.CC.15    (IUPAC: (ruthenium,nickel) arsenide)
Rutheniridosmine (alloy: IMA1973 s.p., 1936 Rd) 1.AF.05   
Ruthenium (element: IMA1974-013) 1.AF.05   
Rutherfordine (IMA1962 s.p., 1906) 5.EB.05    (IUPAC: uranyl carbonate)
Rutile (rutile: 1800) 4.DB.05    (IUPAC: titanium(IV) oxide)
Ryabchikovite (pyroxene: IMA2021-011)  [no] [no] (IUPAC: copper magnesium hexaoxodisilicate)
Rynersonite (aeschynite: IMA1974-058) 4.DF.05    (IUPAC: calcium ditantalum hexaoxide)

External links
IMA Database of Mineral Properties/ RRUFF Project
Mindat.org - The Mineral Database
Webmineral.com
Mineralatlas.eu minerals P, Q and R